The Councils of Two Hundred were the legislative authorities in four Swiss cities (Zürich, Bern, Fribourg, Basel), as well as in the independent Republic of Geneva prior to the French Revolution. Although the council in Geneva dates to 1526, the councils were medieval in origin. They sometimes contained as many as 300 members.

They were superseded by smaller legislatures with a less specific name of "Grand Council" (Grosser Rat or Grand Conseil).

Bibliography
 

Political history of Switzerland
Legal history of Switzerland